Denna Christine Laing (born May 12, 1991) is an American former professional ice hockey player. She last played for the Boston Pride of the National Women's Hockey League (NWHL) until a career-ending injury. At the collegiate level, she accumulated 77 points while competing for the Princeton Tigers women's ice hockey program from 2010 to 2014. She was also the captain her junior and senior year.

Playing career

CWHL
Selected in the 8th round of the 2014 CWHL Draft, Laing played for the Boston Blades of the Canadian Women's Hockey League (CWHL) during the 2014–15 season, accumulating two points in 18 games played. She competed in all postseason games and helped the Blades capture the 2015 Clarkson Cup.

NWHL
In 2015, Laing signed with the Boston Pride of the new NWHL professional league. On December 31, 2015, Laing participated in the 2016 Outdoor Women's Classic, the first outdoor professional women's hockey game. During the first period, Laing went into the boards head first. Removed from the ice on a stretcher, she was taken to the hospital. On January 8, 2016, Laing's family announced that she had had a severe spinal cord injury and that she had limited movement of her arms and no feeling in her legs.

Post-playing career
Laing competed in the 2017 Boston Marathon, being pushed in a special racing wheelchair by fellow Massachusite and former NHL star Bobby Carpenter. The pair finished the race with a time of 4:32:30.

Awards
ECAC
 All-Academic Team (2013)
 Second Team All-Ivy (2014)

Princeton Team Awards
 Rookie of the Year (2011)

NWHL
 NWHL Foundation Award (2016)
 NWHL Perseverance Award (2016)

Statistics

See also
 Travis Roy

References

Further reading

External links
 
 
 Denna Laing at Princeton Tigers
 
 

1991 births
Living people
American female wheelchair racers
Boston Blades players
Boston Pride players
Clarkson Cup champions
Ice hockey players from Massachusetts
Premier Hockey Federation players
People from Marblehead, Massachusetts
People with tetraplegia
Princeton Tigers women's ice hockey players
American women's ice hockey forwards
Sportspeople from Essex County, Massachusetts